The Ateneo de Zamboanga University (Filipino: Pamantasang Ateneo de Zamboanga), also referred to by its acronym AdZU is a private Catholic coeducational basic and higher education institution run by the Philippine Province of the Society of Jesus in Zamboanga City, Philippines. It is the second oldest Jesuit school in the Philippines. It operates on three campuses.

History 
AdZU began in 1912 as Escuela Catolica, a parochial school run by Spanish Jesuits.  It initially offered primary and secondary education for boys. It became a college in 1952 and a university in August 2001.

On July 7, 2017, the historic 67-year-old Brebeuf Gymnasium was razed to the ground; the Sauras, Kostka, and Gonzaga Halls were also affected. The Zamboanga City government estimated the damages to amount to 5 million.

Academics

Admissions 
AdZU operates with a selective admissions policy. All of the units of the university require, among other things, passing an entrance examination (which in the case of the Grade School is instead termed an 'assessment test'); past education records are also required for examination. The School of Medicine requires results in the National Medical Admission Test while the College of Law requires results in the PhilSAT; all other units administer their own entrance examinations.

Student council 
The Sanggunian ng mga Mag-aaral ng Ateneo de Zamboanga University (SMADZU) was the college unit's student government before 2009. Currently in its place is El Consejo Atenista, which was created with the objective of being a more representative student government.

Campuses

AdZU operates three campuses.
 Fr. Eusebio G. Salvador, S.J. (Main) Campus. The main campus (4.3 hectares) on La Purisima Street, named for Fr. Eusebio Salvador, S.J., houses the undergraduate and graduate schools and the Senior High School unit.
 Fr. William H. Kreutz, S.J. Campus. The second campus (8.3 hectares) in Barangay Tumaga, which is outside Zamboanga City proper, named for Fr. William Kreutz, S.J., is home to the Junior High School and Grade School units.
 Lantaka Campus. The Ateneo de Zamboanga University Lantaka Campus is situated along the coastline of Zamboanga City and was previously a resort hotel. This campus will be used as a place for students' and staff's retreats, recollections, meetings, seminars and conferences.

See also
List of Jesuit educational institutions in the Philippines
List of Jesuit educational institutions
Zamboanga City
 List of Jesuit sites

References

External links
Official website

Jesuit universities and colleges in the Philippines
Educational institutions established in 1912
Universities and colleges in Zamboanga City
1912 establishments in the Philippines
Schools in Zamboanga City